This article consists of a list of episodes of the animated series Static Shock.

Series overview

Episodes

Season 1 (2000–01)

Season 2 (2002)

Season 3 (2003)

Season 4 (2004)

See also
 "The Once and Future Thing", a two-part 2005 crossover episode with Justice League Unlimited

External links
 

Static Shock
Static Shock
Lists of American children's animated television series episodes